Ragdan is a mountain peak of the Greater Caucasus range, located in the Qusar District of Azerbaijan and Dokuzparinsky District of Dagestan, Russia.

Geography 
Ragdan sits among two other peaks in the Greater Caucasus range, Bazarduzu and Charundagh.

References 

Four-thousanders of the Caucasus
Mountains of Azerbaijan
Mountains of Russia
Mountains of the Caucasus